Vicente Javier 'Xavi' Valero Verchili (born 28 February 1973), is a Spanish former football goalkeeper and current goalkeeping coach for Premier League team West Ham United.

Football career

Player
Valero was born in Castellón de la Plana in the Valencian Community. He played 67 games in Segunda División, winning promotion with RCD Mallorca (1997), Real Murcia (2003) and Recreativo de Huelva in 2006, despite not being first-choice in any of those campaigns. He also represented Córdoba CF in that division, and played 92 Segunda División B matches, mainly for his hometown club CD Castellón.

Released by Córdoba in 2004 but still training with the club, Valero moved abroad for the only time as a player in January 2005, to sign a one-month non-contract deal with Wrexham in Football League One. Manager Denis Smith signed him based on video footage. As first-choice Andy Dibble had a thigh injury, Valero made his debut on 11 January in a 2–2 draw at Peterborough United. He made two more league appearances for the Red Dragons, as well as a 2–1 win in the FAW Premier Cup quarter-finals away to Haverfordwest County on 18 January, and shared teams with compatriot striker Juan Ugarte.

Goalkeeping coach
After retiring from playing, Valero took his coaching badges, gaining a Masters in Goalkeeper Coaching from the Royal Spanish Football Federation (RFEF) and a Master of Sports Psychology UNED in Madrid.

After José Ochotorena decided to return to Spain to work with Valencia, Rafael Benítez appointed Valero head goalkeeping coach of Liverpool in July 2007. He was praised by Liverpool striker Fernando Torres as one of the biggest reasons for his goals; during training, he instructed the players on how goalkeepers in future games react to one-on-one situations.

Valero remained in Benítez's coaching staff at Inter Milan, Napoli and Real Madrid. In June 2018, he was named as goalkeeping coach as part of Manuel Pellegrini's staff at West Ham United.

References

External links
Xavi Valero at Soccerbase
Xavi Valero at BDFutbol

1973 births
Living people
Sportspeople from Castellón de la Plana
Spanish footballers
Footballers from the Valencian Community
Association football goalkeepers
Segunda División players
Segunda División B players
CD Castellón footballers
RCD Mallorca B players
RCD Mallorca players
CD Logroñés footballers
Real Murcia players
Córdoba CF players
Wrexham A.F.C. players
Recreativo de Huelva players
UDA Gramenet footballers
English Football League players
Liverpool F.C. non-playing staff
Real Madrid CF non-playing staff
West Ham United F.C. non-playing staff
Expatriate footballers in Wales
Spanish expatriate footballers
Spanish expatriate sportspeople in Wales
Association football goalkeeping coaches
Spanish expatriate sportspeople in England
Spanish expatriate sportspeople in Italy